Toepisa Gewog (Dzongkha: སཏོད་པའི་ས་) is a gewog (village block) of Punakha District, Bhutan. It used to be part of Thimphu District.

References

Gewogs of Bhutan
Punakha District